Youth of PAICV is the youth organisation of the African Party for the Independence of Cape Verde.

History 

The organisation was founded on September 12, 1974, as African Youth Amílcar Cabral (Juventude Africana Amílcar Cabral) as the youth organisation for the African Party for the Independence of Guinea and Cape Verde, which operated in both Cape Verde and Guinea-Bissau. When the Cape Verdean section of PAIGC formed its own party, the organisation was renamed Youth of PAICV.

Organisation 

JPAI is a full member of the International Union of Socialist Youth.

African Party for the Independence of Cape Verde
Socialism in Cape Verde
Youth wings of political parties in Cape Verde
Youth wings of social democratic parties